Willy Verginer (born February 23, 1957, in Brixen, South Tyrol) is an Italian contemporary artist and sculptor who lives and works in Ortisei, Italy.

References

External links
Willy Verginer official website
Artist's Page on Artsy

Italian artists
1957 births
Living people